Neukirchen may refer to:

People
Heinz Neukirchen (1915 – 1986), German naval officer and author

Places in Austria
Neukirchen an der Enknach, in the Braunau am Inn district, Upper Austria
Neukirchen am Walde, in the Grieskirchen district, Upper Austria
Neukirchen an der Vöckla, in the Vöcklabruck district, Upper Austria
Neukirchen bei Lambach, in the Wels-Land district, Upper Austria 
Neukirchen am Ostrong, a part of Pöggstall, Lower Austria 
Neukirchen (Brunn an der Wild), a part of Brunn an der Wild, Lower Austria
Neukirchen am Großvenediger, Salzburgerland

Places in Germany

Bavaria
Neukirchen, Lower Bavaria, in the Straubing-Bogen district
Neukirchen-Balbini, in the Schwandorf district
Neukirchen beim Heiligen Blut, in the Cham district
Neukirchen bei Sulzbach-Rosenberg, in the Amberg-Sulzbach district
Neukirchen vorm Wald, in the Passau district
Neukirchen an der Alz, a locality of Kirchweidach in the Altötting district
Neukirchen bei Ansbach, a part of Sachsen bei Ansbach in the Ansbach district
Neukirchen bei Erding, a locality in the Erding district

Hesse
Neukirchen, Hesse, a city in the Schwalm-Eder-Kreis district

North Rhine-Westphalia
Neukirchen-Vluyn, a city in the Wesel district

Saxony
Neukirchen, Erzgebirgskreis, in the Erzgebirgskreis district
Neukirchen, Zwickau, in the Zwickau district

Saxony-Anhalt
Neukirchen, Saxony-Anhalt, a town in the district of Stendal

Schleswig-Holstein
Neukirchen, Nordfriesland, part of the Amt Südtondern
Neukirchen, Ostholstein, part of the Amt Oldenburg-Land
A locality of Quern in Schleswig-Flensburg district
A locality of Malente in Ostholstein district

Thuringia
Neukirchen (Eisenach), in Eisenach, Thuringia